Hedju Hor was a ruler in northern Egypt from the Predynastic Period. His existence is controversial. The name Hedju-Hor means The maces of Horus.

It is thought that his reign was around 3250 BC, but almost nothing is known of it, as he is known only from inscriptions found in the Nile Delta region and pottery shards from Tura. It has been conjectured that he was the first pharaoh of Lower Egypt, or the last; or that he was a member of Dynasty 0.

Hedju-Hor is only known from two clay jugs on which his serekh appears: one from Tura in the eastern Nile Delta and one from Abu Zeidan on the northeastern tip of the Nile Delta.

Egyptologist Wolfgang Helck held him as a Pharaoh of Dynasty 0 and identified him with Wash, who is known as the ruler defeated by Narmer on the Narmer Palette, an opinion later shared by Edwin van den Brink. By contrast, Toby Wilkinson and Jochem Kahl both argue that Hedju Hor was not a pre-dynastic Pharaoh but, rather, a ruler of a small proto-state of the pre-dynastic era and have attributed to him the title King.
 
Hedju-Hor has no known tomb and is not found in the text of the Palermo Stone, the oldest-known king list, further making the claims of both Helck and van den Brink unlikely.

References

Predynastic pharaohs
Year of birth unknown
Year of death unknown